Flashpoint Productions later known as MediaTech West (also known as Bethesda West) was a video game developer based in Olympia, Washington.

History

Founded by Brent Erickson in Utah in 1992. In July 1994, the company moved from Utah to Lacey and at the time had 18 employees. The firm produced musical scores used in network broadcast news shows and Entertainment Tonight.

The company was sold to Media Technology/Bethesda Softworks in 1995 who Erickson felt shared his philosophy. As a result Brent became Bethesda's development director. 

As Bethesda West, the company developed the IHRA Drag Racing games.

Games developed or Co-developed

References

American companies established in 1992
Defunct companies based in Olympia, Washington
ZeniMax Media
Video game companies established in 1992